Ohafia is an Igbo town in the Ohafia local government area (LGA) in Abia State, Nigeria. It is an Igbo speaking region. The ancestral capital of Ohafia town is the centrally located village of Elu. Ohafia Local Government Area, is an administrative jurisdiction assigned by the Nigeria Government, which covers the entire Ohafia villages and other towns such as Abiriba and Nkporo, with its Administrative Headquarters at Ebem Ohafia.
 
The ancestors of the Ohafia people were renowned as mighty warriors. This aspect of the Ohafia peoples' history remains fundamental to the Ohafia people's sense of identity. The knitted warrior's cap or "leopard cap" is well known and is an associated product of Ohafia. The Ohafia warrior tradition is embodied in the performance of iri agha.

Ohafia is home to the third largest military base in Nigeria, named Goodluck Jonathan Barracks after Nigeria's former President - Goodluck Jonathan. It houses the headquarters of the newly established 14 Brigade and 145 Battalion office complex of the Nigerian Army.

Ohafia encompasses twenty-six villages with population strength ranging between 800,000 and 916,000 as of 2014. And it is at a distance of 50.1 km away from the Capital city Umuahia in Abia State. The villages in Ohafia are Elu, Ibina (Ihenta), Nde Okala, Nde Anyaorie, Amuma, Amaekpu, Ebem, Nde Amogu, Okagwe, Nde Uduma Ukwu, Oboro, Nde Nku, Nkwebi, Amuke, Asaga, Ndi Uduma Awoke, Amankwu, Nde Ibe, Nde Orieke, Okon-aku, Amangwu, Ufiele, Eziafor, Abia, Akanu, Isiugwu.

Notable people

 Ogbugo Kalu, former army officer who served in both the Nigerian Army and Biafran Army
 Eni Njoku, first black vice chancellor of University of Lagos and University of Nigeria Nsukka. The pioneer professor of botany in Nigeria.
 Ruggedman, Afro-rap artiste
 Ezinne Kalu, Female Basketball player
 J. Martins, Afro-pop artiste
 Ike Nwachukwu, military officer, former governor of old Imo state, diplomat and former senator
 Ebitu Ukiwe, military officer, former military governor of Lagos state and Niger State, former chief of general staff (de facto vice president) to General Babangida's military government
 Kalu Idika Kalu is a former finance minister of Nigeria, minister of national planning and transportation minister. He served twice as the minister of finance.[3] He was a presidential aspirant in the 2003 Nigeria general elections, of the Federal Republic of Nigeria, under the platform of The New Nigeria Peoples Party (NNPP).
 Chief Ojo Maduekwe, a former minister of culture and tourism (1999), minister of transportation (2000–2003), minister of foreign affairs (2007–2010 and national secretary to the People Democratic Party.
 Chief Umeh Kalu, He served as the Attorney General of Abia State and Commissioner for Justice of Abia State. Office: Attorney General of Abia State (Since 2007), Previous office: Attorney General of Abia State (2009 - 2019), Education: Nigerian Law School · Imo State University.

References 

Towns in Abia State
Local Government Areas in Abia State
Cities in Abia State